Pinus resinosa, known as red pine (also Norway pine in Minnesota), is a pine native to North America.

Description
Red pine is a coniferous evergreen tree characterized by tall, straight growth. The crown is conical, becoming a narrow rounded dome with age. The bark is thick and gray-brown at the base of the tree, but thin, flaky and bright orange-red in the upper crown; the tree's name derives from this distinctive character. Some red color may be seen in the fissures of the bark. The species is self pruning; there tend not to be dead branches on the trees, and older trees may have very long lengths of branchless trunk below the canopy.

The leaves snap cleanly when bent; this character, stated as diagnostic for red pine in some texts, is however shared by several other pine species.

Phylogeny 
Red pine is notable for its very constant morphology and low genetic variation throughout its range, suggesting it has been through a near extinction in its recent evolutionary history. A genetic study of nuclear microsatellite polymorphisms among populations distributed throughout its natural range found that red pine populations from Newfoundland are genetically distinct from most mainland populations, consistent with dispersal from different glacial refugia in this highly self-pollinating species.

Distribution and habitat
It occurs from Newfoundland west to Manitoba, and south to Pennsylvania, with several smaller, disjunct populations occurring in the Appalachian Mountains in Virginia and West Virginia, as well as a few small pockets in extreme northern New Jersey and northern Illinois.

It can be found in a variety of habitats.

Ecology
It is intolerant of shade, but does well in windy sites; it grows best in well-drained soil. It is a long-lived tree, reaching a maximum age of about 500 years.

Uses 
The wood is commercially valuable in forestry for timber and paper pulp, and the tree is also used for landscaping.

In culture 
The red pine is Minnesota's state tree. In Minnesota the use of the name "Norway" may stem from early Scandinavian immigrants who likened the American red pines to the Scots pines back home.

References

External links 

 Interactive Distribution Map of Red Pine at plantmaps.com

resinosa
Trees of humid continental climate
Flora of Eastern Canada
Trees of the Northeastern United States
Trees of Manitoba
Trees of the North-Central United States
Least concern flora of the United States
Trees of the Great Lakes region (North America)
Trees of Western Canada